San Pietro is the duomo or main church of the town of Rogliano, Province of Calabria, Italy.

Description 
The church was built in baroque style. The portal in tufo stone dates to 1717, and the interior stucco dates from the 18th century. Inside a gilded chapel is the icon of the Immaculate Conception, which represents the patron of the city. The church has frescoes by the 19th century painter Enrico Salfi.

References

18th-century establishments in Italy
Roman Catholic churches in Calabria